The Refugium Range is a low, small mountain range comprising the mountains/hills of the Brooks Peninsula on northern Vancouver Island, British Columbia, Canada.

See also
List of mountain ranges
Brooks Peninsula Provincial Park
Brooks Peninsula

References

Vancouver Island Ranges
Mountain ranges of British Columbia